Ijimaia plicatellus is a species of jellynose fish in the family Ateleopodidae. Their distribution is in the Eastern Central Pacific near Hawaii, at depths from 265 to 500 meters. The species can reach up to 68 centimeters in length.

References

Fish described in 1905
Ateleopodiformes